The  is a group of three late Yayoi period burial mounds located in the Shimofukuda neighborhood of the city of  Kurayoshi, Tottori Prefecture in the San'in region of Japan. The tumulus group was designated a National Historic Site of Japan in 1981.

Overview
The Amidaji Kofun cluster is  located on the side of a hill overlooking Kokubugawa River. The cluster consists of three  -style tumuli. This is a variation of the -style square tumulus with polygonal-shaped protrusions on each of its four corners. This style is unique to the Kibi, San'in and San'yō regions of Japan. Tumulus No. 1 is about 17.8 meters long, including protrusions, Tumulus No. 2 is 8.8 meters long, and Tumulus No. 3 is 7.8 meters long. Parts of the slopes and protrusions were protected by river stones, similar to fukiishi. Archaeological excavations were conducted in 1979 and 1980.  Yayoi pottery, both ceremonial and for everyday use, was found around the protruding portions, but the burial chambers were not excavated. Currently, the site is backfilled for preservation, and the excavated artifacts are stored in the Kurayoshi Museum.

The site is located a ten-minute walk from  "Kamifukuda" bus stop on the  Hinomaru Bus  from Kurayoshi Station on the JR West San'in Main Line.

See also
List of Historic Sites of Japan (Tottori)

References

External links
 Cultural properties of Tottori 
Kurayoshi City home page 

Kofun
Yayoi period
History of Tottori Prefecture
Kurayoshi, Tottori
Historic Sites of Japan
Archaeological sites in Japan